West Prong Waterman Wash is a tributary steam or arroyo of Waterman Wash, in Maricopa County, Arizona.

References

Rivers of Maricopa County, Arizona
Washes of Arizona